Fedja van Huêt (born 21 June 1973, in The Hague) is a Dutch stage and film actor.

Van Huêt received his professional training at the Maastricht Academy of Dramatic Arts. He was in the ensemble of the theater companies RO Theater and Theatercompagnie/Hollandia. At present, Van Huêt is connected to Toneelgroep Amsterdam.

In 2001 he received the Gouden Kalf award, the most prestigious film prize in the Netherlands, for best actor in the film AmnesiA.

Van Huêt has been in relationships with actresses Katja Schuurman and Halina Reijn.

Selected filmography
Return to Oegstgeest (1987) as Little Peter
Character (1997) as Jacob Willem Katadreuffe
Wilde Mossels (2000) as Leen
AmnesiA (2001)
The Preacher (2004) as Crime Lawyer
Waiter (2006) as Ralph
Loft (2010) as Bart
The Zigzag Kid (2012) as Jacob
Daylight (2013)
Soof (2013)
Accused (2014)
Bloed, zweet & tranen (2015) as Tim Griek
The Little Gangster (2015)
J. Kessels (2015)
De Held (2016)
Amsterdam Vice (2019)
(2019)
Soof 3 (2022)
Speak No Evil (2022)

TV (films and series)
Supporting roles in Baantjer, Oppassen!!! and Goede tijden, slechte tijden, leading role in "Overspel" ("Adulterer")

References

External links

1971 births
Living people
Male actors from The Hague
Dutch male film actors
Dutch male television actors
Dutch male stage actors
Golden Calf winners
20th-century Dutch male actors
21st-century Dutch male actors